Joshua Michael Blackman is an American lawyer who is employed as an associate professor of law at the South Texas College of Law where he focuses on constitutional law and the intersection of law and technology. He has authored three books.

After attending Penn State University in State College, Pennsylvania, and the Antonin Scalia Law School (then George Mason University Law School) in Arlington, Virginia, Blackman worked as a law clerk for the United States District Court for the Western District of Pennsylvania under Judge Kim R. Gibson from 2009 to 2011. He then worked for the United States Court of Appeals for the Sixth Circuit under Judge Danny Julian Boggs from 2011 to 2012.

Life and career
Blackman attended Pennsylvania State University, and graduated in 2005 with a BS in Information Sciences and Technology in 2005. He then attended George Mason Law School, (now the Antonin Scalia Law School), graduating with a JD in 2009. After finishing law school, Blackman clerked for judge Kim R. Gibson in Johnstown, Pennsylvania, and subsequently for Judge Danny Julian Boggs.

In 2009 he launched FantasySCOTUS, a United States Supreme Court prediction market. In 2010, his personal blog was identified as a top 100 law blog by the American Bar Association, which took note of his claim to have co-developed an algorithm to predict the outcome of Supreme Court cases. 

Blackman joined the South Texas College of Law in 2012, where he teaches property, constitutional law, and legal theory. He has appeared as a speaker for the Federalist Society, and is an adjunct scholar at the Cato Institute.

Court cases

In 2015, Blackman represented Defense Distributed in their First Amendment challenge to the International Traffic in Arms Regulations ban on 3D printed gun files. The lawsuit was settled in 2018.

CUNY incident
On March 29, 2018, at a Federalist Society event hosted by CUNY Law School, Blackman's presentation was disrupted by campus protesters. Blackman later shared a video of the incident, in which he was heckled and shouted down for approximately ten minutes before the protestors left the room. Some of the protestors objected to Blackman's support for President Trump's decision to end the Deferred Action for Childhood Arrivals (DACA) program, although Blackman explained that he would support a DACA law that was passed by Congress.

Books

 Blackman, Josh, and Randy Barnett. Unprecedented: The Constitutional Challenge to Obamacare. PublicAffairs, 2013. 
 Blackman, Josh. Unraveled: Obamacare, Religious Liberty, and Executive Power. Cambridge University Press, 2016. 
 Barnett, Randy E., and Josh Blackman. An Introduction to Constitutional Law: 100 Supreme Court Cases Everyone Should Know. Wolters Kluwer, 2020.

References

External links 
 
 
 Posts by Blackman on The Volokh Conspiracy blog

Living people
20th-century American lawyers
21st-century American lawyers
American male bloggers
American bloggers
American legal scholars
American legal writers
American libertarians
American male writers
American political writers
Cato Institute people
Federalist Society members
Pennsylvania State University alumni
21st-century American non-fiction writers
Year of birth missing (living people)